Pariambus typicus is a species of amphipod crustacean. It is found in the Atlantic Ocean from northern Norway south to the Cape Verde Islands and into the Mediterranean Sea as far east as Italy. It is absent from the Baltic Sea, suggesting that it requires water of high salinity. The species is sometimes included in the family Pariambidae, but more usually in the Caprellidae.

References

Corophiidea
Crustaceans described in 1844
Crustaceans of the Atlantic Ocean
Taxa named by Henrik Nikolai Krøyer